Arctic Village may refer to:
Arctic Village, Alaska
Arctic Village (book)
China's Arctic village